Oleksiy Chychykоv (born 30 September 1987 in Poltava, Ukraine) is a professional Ukrainian football striker who plays for FC Akzhayik.

Career
He played for Vorskla Poltava in the Ukrainian Premier League. He joined Vorskla Poltava from Lokomotiv Moskva in February 2008.

He played one game for FC Lokomotiv Moscow in the Russian Cup 2006–07 season (Lokomotiv ended up winning that tournament).

References

External links 
 Official Website Profile
 Profile on Football Squads

1987 births
Living people
People from Kremenchuk
Ukrainian footballers
Ukrainian expatriate footballers
FC Vorskla Poltava players
FC Dnipro players
FC Lokomotiv Moscow players
Ukrainian Premier League players
Expatriate footballers in Russia
Ukrainian expatriate sportspeople in Russia
Expatriate footballers in Kazakhstan
Ukrainian expatriate sportspeople in Kazakhstan
FC Zirka Kropyvnytskyi players
SC Dnipro-1 players
FC Akzhayik players
Association football forwards
Sportspeople from Poltava Oblast